Alvin Joseph Jurisich (August 25, 1921 – November 3, 1981) was an American professional baseball player of Croat descent. A right-handed pitcher, the native of New Orleans, appeared in 104 games in Major League Baseball between 1944 and 1947 for the St. Louis Cardinals and Philadelphia Phillies.

Jurisich appeared in one contest as a relief pitcher in the "All-St. Louis" 1944 World Series, won by his Cardinals in six games over the St. Louis Browns. He entered Game 3 in the bottom of the seventh inning with the Cardinals trailing, 4–2. He gave up two hits, doubles to Don Gutteridge and George McQuinn, and was charged with two earned runs in two-thirds of an inning. The Browns would win the game, 6–2.

Jurisich was mainly a relief pitcher in the Majors, but he did make 42 starts in his 104 appearances and notched 13 complete games. He gave up 344 hits in 388 innings pitched, and issued 189 bases on balls. He had 177 strikeouts and five saves.

References

External links

1921 births
1981 deaths
Baseball players from New Orleans
Birmingham Barons players
Major League Baseball pitchers
New Orleans Pelicans (baseball) players
Opelousas Indians players
Philadelphia Phillies players
Rochester Red Wings players
St. Louis Cardinals players
San Diego Padres (minor league) players
American people of Croatian descent

In his rookie debut Al Jurisich pitched 12 3/4 no hit innings for the Cardinals vs the Reds on April 8,1944 . This is second only to Pete Henning who went 13 for KC against the Chicago Chi-Feds in 1908. As baseball is played today, this record will never be broken.